Eluxolweni is an informal settlement situated next to the N2 freeway just north of Mdantsane. It falls under Buffalo City Metropolitan Municipality in the Eastern Cape province of South Africa.

References

Populated places in Buffalo City Metropolitan Municipality